Eddie Ludick (born ) is a South African rugby union player for the  in the Pro14. His regular position is centre or wing.

References

South African rugby union players
Living people
1999 births
Rugby union centres
Rugby union wings
Southern Kings players